Alex Harvey  may refer to:
Alex Harvey (actor), American actor
Alex Harvey (musician) (1935–1982), Scottish musician
Alex Harvey (country musician) (1947–2020), songwriter from Tennessee
Alex Harvey (curler), Scottish wheelchair curler
Alex Harvey (skier) (born 1988), Canadian cross-country skier

See also

Alexander Harvey (disambiguation)